Alexandre Miguel Candeias Rita (born 6 April 1995) is a Portuguese footballer of Angolan descent who plays for Barreirense as a midfielder.

Football career
On 16 November 2014, Rita made his professional debut with Oriental in a 2014–15 Taça da Liga match against Boavista.

References

External links

1995 births
Footballers from Luanda
Portuguese sportspeople of Angolan descent
Angolan emigrants to Portugal
Living people
Portuguese footballers
Association football midfielders
Clube Oriental de Lisboa players
Liga Portugal 2 players
F.C. Barreirense players